Ghassan Massoud ( / ; born September 20, 1958) is a Syrian actor and filmmaker. He is best known in the West for his role as Saladin in Ridley Scott's 2005 film Kingdom of Heaven.

Career
Massoud is known in Syria for his appearance in many Syrian-made films, and writing and directing the theatre play Diplomasiyyoun, and was part of the Syrian Ministry of Culture’s National Theater’s 2002 season. He has appeared in the Syrian television miniseries The Chant of Rain, and in Haytham Hakky's well known work Memories of the Forthcoming Age, and on the Syrian stage was an actor in August Strindberg's Miss Julie. Most recently, he starred as the companion of Muhammad, Abu Bakr in MBC's series Omar.

Internationally, he is known for playing the role of Ayyubid sultan Saladin in Ridley Scott's 2005 film Kingdom of Heaven. He also played the "Sheikh" in the 2006 Turkish film Kurtlar Vadisi: Irak (Valley of the Wolves: Iraq), Ammand the Corsair in Pirates of the Caribbean: At World's End. and Ramesses II's Grand Vizier, Paser in Ridley Scott's 2014 Bible epic, Exodus. Massoud turned down a role in the 2005 film Syriana, claiming he feared the movie would be anti-Arab. When refusing the position, Massoud also highlighted worries about the political climate of his nation and the surrounding area. After watching the finished picture, he stated he later regretted his choice.

Personal life
Massoud was born in Damascus, originally from Fajlit, Duraykish District, Tartus Governorate.

He is married and has a son and a daughter. Massoud teaches Drama at both the Damascus Music and Drama School and Higher Institute for Dramatic Arts.

Filmography

See also
 Khaled Taja
 Duraid Lahham

References

External links

1958 births
Living people
People from Damascus
Syrian male film actors
Syrian Alawites
Syrian male television actors
Academic staff of the Higher Institute of Dramatic Arts (Damascus)